Leonurus japonicus, commonly called oriental motherwort or Chinese motherwort, is a herbaceous flowering plant native to Asia, including Korea and Japan, and China to Cambodia.

Description
Plants are annual or biennial, growing from taproots. The flowers are sessile and produced in verticillasters. The corolla  is white or reddish to purplish red in color. Plants bloom from June to September.

It has escaped cultivation and become naturalized in other parts of the world including South and North America, Europe and Africa.

Uses
Leonurus japonicus is one of the 50 fundamental herbs used in traditional Chinese medicine, where it is called yìmǔcǎo, literally "beneficial herb for mothers". It is used in cases of menstrual and delivery disorders caused by blood stasis such as dysmenorrhea and amenorrhea.

Chemical constituents
Chemical compounds found in Leonurus japonicus include guanosine, rutin, syringic acid, and stigmasterol.

Gallery

References

External links

Plants for a Future

Lamiaceae
Flora of China
Flora of Eastern Asia
Flora of Indo-China
Garden plants of Asia
Plants used in traditional Chinese medicine
Plants described in 1778
Taxa named by Martinus Houttuyn